Fanny Rice (1859-1936), or Fannie Rice, was an American singer, comedienne and actress of stage and screen. She was born to Edward C. Rice and Ianthe Rice (nee Blanchard). She had two siblings an older brother Henry, who died as a child, and two older sisters Clara and Laura.

Beginning her career in the 1880s she appeared on stage with many stage luminaries of the day like Francis Wilson, Jefferson De Angelis, Joseph Jefferson and Mrs. John Drew all costarring in a popular revival of Sheridans The Rivals.

Her tenure in films was brief making three silent films between 1919 and 1920.

She died in July 1936 and is interred under her married name of Purdy.

FilmographyThe Moonshine Trail (1919)Dawn (1919)My Husband's Other Wife (1920)

References

External links

 
Fanny Rice portraits(NYPublic Library, Billy Rose collection)
Sarony portrait of Fanny Rice, with description and text attributed to the later Fanny Brice(archived)
Fanny Rice in portrait by Newsboy'' photographer's studio(archived)

1859 births
1936 deaths
19th-century American actresses
American stage actresses
American silent film actresses
20th-century American actresses
19th-century American singers
19th-century American women singers
Actresses from Massachusetts
People from Lowell, Massachusetts